The Damnation of Theron Ware (first published in England as Illumination) is an 1896 novel by American author Harold Frederic. Set in upstate New York, the novel presents a portrait of 19th-century provincial United States, the religious life of its ethnic groups, and its intellectual and artistic culture. It is written in a realistic style. According to Publishers Weekly, it was the fifth-best-selling book in the United States in 1896.

Theron Ware is a promising young Methodist pastor recently assigned to a congregation is small town in the Adirondack Mountains, which Frederic modeled after Utica, New York. His education has been limited and his experiences limited to church society and his strict enforcement of its norms. Theron has a number of experiences that cause him to begin to question the Methodist religion, his role as a minister and the existence of God. His "illumination" consists of his awakening to new intellectual and artistic experiences embodied by several of his new acquaintances including the town's Catholic priest who introduces him to the latest Biblical scholarship; a local man of science, who eschews religion and advocates for Darwin; and a local Irish Catholic girl with musical talent and artistic pretensions, with whom Theron becomes infatuated. In the end, these three characters grow disappointed in Theron, who initially represented an interesting social specimen but whose emergence from naivete and disparagement of his congregation disappoint them. A parallel concern is the role of women in this society, with model provided by Theron's wife, the musician-aesthete, and a church fundraiser who charms Theron with a common-sensical approach to religious affairs. Having lost his vocation and his new friends, Theron departs for Seattle, where he imagines he might use his oratorical skills to enter politics.

Characters
 Theron Ware, a Methodist minister, "ambitious beyond his limited abilities, foolish, spineless and self-deluding"
 Alice Ware, his wife
 Loren Pierce, trustee of Octavius Methodist church
 Erastus Winch, trustee of the Octavius Methodist church
 Levi Gorringe, trustee of the Octavius Methodist church; not a professed Methodist
 Father Vincent Forbes, Irish Catholic priest
 Celia Madden, daughter of the wealthiest man in Octavius; organist and aesthete; friend of Forbes
 Dr. Ledsmar, elderly scientist and scholar; friend of Forbes and Madden
 Candace Soulsby, an itinerant specialist in raising money from Methodist congregations

Plot summary

Part I
The congregation of The First Methodist Episcopal Church of Tecumseh sits in their exquisite sanctuary, awaiting the decision of whom they are going to appoint as the new pastor for their church. The members of the congregation regard their time at the church with such high importance that they pay hundreds of dollars to rent the front pews. When the new pastor is announced, Abram G. Tisdale, members of the congregation began leaving upset and selling their pews for sixty dollars. The man they wanted to be appointed, Theron Ware, was appointed to the church in Octavius. After the ceremony, Theron and his wife are disappointed, but Theron tells her there is nothing more they can do.

In their new home in Octavius, the Wares are surprised that the milk delivery boy informs them that they will be pressured by the congregation to not have milk delivered on Sundays. Theron reminisces about how he arrived in Octavius. A young minister who changed his first parish in Tyre into an over-capacity congregation, met his wife Alice in Tyre and had a quick marriage. However, the Wares found themselves eight hundred dollars in debt, not knowing how to budget the church and their own lives. As they trimmed down the spending both in the church and in their personal lives, by selling possessions and their piano, the clergy once again began to dwindle. Their third year at Tyre, a man named Abram Beekman gave them a loan. Theron, determined to show that he could do better in a bigger congregation, went to the conference at Tecumseh to prove his abilities, only to be placed in Octavius.

Theron meets with three trustees from the church — Pierce, Winch, and Gorringe — in his house. Pierce tells Ware that he is not to use "dictionary words" because he does not want people to be redirected to one of the two Catholic churches in Octavius. They discuss the church finances and they try to make him take a pay cut and pay for his gas bill. Theron refuses, and Gorringe is the only level headed of the trustees as they get angrier and nearly threaten him. They agree to bring in a "debt-raiser" to reduce the church's debt, and after the meeting Theron tells his wife that he nearly thought he should go out and learn a trade.

After a good first sermon at his church in Octavius, Theron ponders his next move as minister, and how to help his overworked wife, as he takes a walk. While on his way back home, he comes upon a procession of people carrying a man. The man, Mr. MacEvoy, is injured and is taken to his house where the people await for the Catholic priest Father Forbes to give the man his last rites. Theron observes the man and other people chanting in Latin and is intrigued.

After the last rites, Father Forbes introduces himself to Theron while they walk away from MacEvoy's house. Forbes leaves and Celia Madden, also at the last rites, introduces herself to Theron. She is the daughter of the owner of the wagon shop where MacEvoy worked, and explained that if she did not attend the last rites, Mrs. Ann MacEvoy would no longer speak to her. She also tells Theron that she is an organist at Forbes' church. When she leaves, Theron ponders how he has never interacted with Catholics before, but that they are not as foreign as he originally thought.

That night at dinner, Theron and his wife talk about their new estate and that it is adequate, but not as nice as they'd like. Theron forgets to tell Alice his thoughts about hiring an aide for her, but talks to her about Father Forbes and asks her why she thinks there is a separation between the Methodists and the Catholics. Alice expresses her dislike for Catholics.

The next day, Alice tells Theron that she won't need a hired girl until winter. Theron goes out to buy a piano for the church and a book for himself, and is upset at the store Thurston's which only carries the most recently popular books and has such low prices that it is putting specialty stores out of business. At the piano store, Theron realizes he is not qualified to pick out a piano and decides to ask Celia to help him pick one out. Back at home, Theron struggles to begin writing a book of his own and is distracted by the fact that he does not own very many books. He suddenly leaves his dinner with Alice to go ask Father Forbes for help.

Theron admires the new, yet-unfinished Catholic cathedral, which he remarks is the finest building in Octavius. When he arrives at Father Forbes' residence, he is greeted by an ugly helper, who leads him into a dimly lit dining room, where Forbes and a stranger are eating. The stranger is Dr. Ledsmar, an elderly man who is nonreligious. Theron talks about his book which he hopes to write about Abraham, and Father Forbes seems to know quite a bit more about Abraham than Theron can comprehend.

Alone, Theron and Dr. Ledsmar talk about why Father Forbes rarely gives a sermon at his church, and Theron discovers it is because the parish need him to participate in the traditions of the church rather than preach. Theron hears organ music from the church, and Ledsmar tells him that it is Celia Madden practicing. Ledsmar doesn't seem to be moved by the music, and he reveals to Theron that he thinks all art is "decay." He invited Theron over to see his collection of books, and Theron finds out that he has a Chinese servant living with him. When Theron leaves, he passes the Catholic Church and the organ music makes him walk inside the church, something he has never done before.

The narration of the novel takes a different turn in the ninth chapter by giving the back story of Celia Madden and her father Jeremiah Madden. Jeremiah, a very rich man, has had multiple wives and multiple children. Celia had been quite the talk of Octavius for her past actions, but Theron knew none of this when he first met her and decided to enter the Catholic Church, where Celia notices him and approaches him to talk.

Celia tells Theron that she hates Dr. Ledsmar for disliking art. She inquires Theron if he likes music, poetry, and books, and he says that he does. Celia tells Theron that she won't like him as a person if he likes Dr. Ledsmar, and that she is upset that Ledsmar is friends with and has influence of Father Forbes. Theron continues to walk Celia home, and she reveals that she is not religious at all, but subscribes to the Greek philosophy of her ancestors, claiming to be Greek herself. Theron forgets to ask her about the piano until after she is inside her house. At the Ware household, Theron wakes up Alice who was sleeping in a chair. He tells her about Ledsmar, whom Alice is very wary of. Alice also complains about their neighbors who are playing the piano so late at night, but Theron enjoys it.

Part II
Theron had not seen Forbes, Ledsmar, or Celia for several weeks because of various events with his church, including the advent of automobiles, a circus, and the scorn from some of the trustees over his style of sermons. Overall, he has been getting good reviews from the parish, but he still wants to improve the church. Alice seems to be more depressed in Octavius than previously. The Wares discuss Gorringe, and how Theron wishes he were a more active member in the church because of his understandings of Theron's activities and motivations.

Finding a spare moment four days before another Methodist conference, Theron gets around to reading some books he borrowed from Dr. Ledsmar. He reads nearly all day long, and when Alice enters the room she is surprised to find him researching his book on Abraham that she thought he abandoned. He tells her that he has a headache, and she is concerned that he is getting sick. When she leaves, he is pleased by his solitude and ability to read the books. He suddenly has a realization that he envies Forbes and Ledsmar, who are able to live with their own theories and ideas, and that Forbes can still work in the religious field. He contemplates leaving his job as a pastor when Alice returns home and introduces him to Sister Soulsby, a debt-raiser whom she hired so the congregation would not take away from the Ware's income and so they can possibly afford a new house.

Sister Soulsby talks with the Methodists in Octavius and after a couple of days proposes a "love-feast" for the congregation. Her idea is confirmed when her husband, Brother Soulsby, arrives. Alice and Theron disagree that springing a debt-raiser on the congregation after a festival is an appropriate way to make money, but the Soulsby argue that they have been raising funds for churches and organizations for a long time, and that they know what they are doing. All the while, Theron worries about his wife. He doesn't seem to care for her as much, and thinks that Forbes and Ledsmar wouldn't regard her very well. He does take note that she has made good friends with Gorringe.

The love-feast occurs at 9:00AM on the next Sunday. The feast includes singing, praying, and speeches. Sister Soulsby gives a particularly good speech that motivates the people of the Methodist church. The presiding elder also speaks, and Alice gets up from her pew to kneel at the front of the sanctuary in prayer, and is joined by the lawyer Gorringe. Theron reads the list of stewards is upset that Gorringe's name is not on the list and feels alienated from the church.

Theron awakes inside his home and remembers that he fainted inside the church due to the heat. He goes outside and finds that the Soulsbys are threatening to "close down" the church until funds are raised to get the church out of debt and a little extra for things that need money. In the end, they raise enough money to give the Wares an extra $100 per year and for themselves to be paid. Later, Theron talks with Gorringe, who is now religiously invested in the church as well as financially. The trustees must vote to see if Erastus Winch will have to pay what he pledged to the church after going bankrupt. The vote comes down to Theron, who votes that he should have to pay.

Sister Soulsby and Theron discuss Erastus Winch's case and how Theron feels bad about forcing him to pay what he cannot afford. Sister Soulsby notes that it is not her place to be moral, but that she did what she was hired to do. She and Theron continue to talk about separating people from their money, and Sister Soulsby tells Theron that he would be terrible at conning anyone.

Part III
Theron and Alice take a walk, and Alice wonders what the congregation will think that they are not at a prayer. She leaves, and Theron begins to think about what Sister Soulsby said about Catholics. He finds himself nearby the Catholic Church and realizes that he probably ended up there because he wanted to run into Celia. He hears her voice and they meet and talk. She invites him into the church so she can play the organ for him. Later, he walks her home and she invites him in. She shows him her workroom and a private room that is "[her] very own."

Celia's room was full of candles, sculptures, art, and a piano. Celia offers Theron a cigarette, which he usually does not smoke, and he accepts. She plays him songs on the piano and later slips into a robe. After she plays more and more songs on the piano, Theron stands up and walks closer to her. They talk softly, and Theron tells her that he wants to experience her Greek philosophy, hinting toward her bedroom. It is late so he has to leave, but Celia knows he will be back and laughs at the situation when he is gone.

The next morning, Theron Ware recognizes that he has in fact gone through an illumination and will never be the same again. Alice notices it too, at breakfast, but thinks that it is because he is overworked by the new parish. Theron decides to write a letter to Celia, but at the end of it cannot think of a good enough word to close his letter. He visits the specialty book store and buys a book entitled George Sand which included information about Chopin, one of Celia's favorite composers. He then hurries off to meet Celia at the piano store where she helps him pick out a piano. He agrees on a cheaper model than Celia originally recommends. They part ways.

Theron meets with Dr. Ledsmar at the doctor's house. He is surprised that the doctor greeted him at the door instead of his "Chinaman". Dr. Ledsmar and Theron talk about women, and Theron thinks of Celia during their conversation. Ledsmar discusses how men have been studying women for ages and that sex is relatively not understood. They talk about the use of flowers, Ledsmar looking at them scientifically instead of aesthetically. Ledsmar then shows Ware his Chinaman, who the doctor is doing experiments on. Theron pries for more information about the rumored relationship between Father Forbes and Celia. The doctor avoids the question by claiming that his shoulder pains him and bids Ware farewell.

Time has passed and Theron is starting to look healthier due to his new outlook on life. His church is thriving because he is following Sister Soulsby's advice. It is time for a conference at the Methodist church in Octavius, and people have come and are camping out for the event. Theron walks among the tents. He continues walking into the woods and comes out at a Catholic picnic. They are drinking beer and he is interested in trying it but doesn't want to approach the bar for himself. Father Forbes and Celia walk up to him as he thinks about how to get a beer.

A young man fetches Theron a beer, and Theron, Forbes, and Celia discuss their respective religions. Forbes convinces Ware that their beliefs aren't too different. After more drinks of lager and talking about how one day there may be one "Church of America", Celia introduces Ware to her brother Michael. Theron and Celia excuse themselves from their company and decide to talk a way in the woods away from the party.

As Celia and Theron walk through the forest, Celia falls to her knees and begins crying. She quickly stops and explains that she doesn't want people to think she is being improper for spending time with Theron. They sit and he comforts her, but their conversation quickly turns to Theron's desire to be free from what holds him down. Celia claims he will never be truly free as he fiddles with a ribbon on her dress. He proclaims himself a Catholic, at which Celia laughs. They get up and leave, but the garden boy for Theron's garden sees them walking together in the woods and Theron and Celia are frightened of what gossip might happen. Celia allows Ware to give her a brief goodbye kiss.

Part IV
The kiss haunts Theron throughout the next weeks. He contemplates leaving his job, but knows that it is currently safe for him to occupy it. He wonders if Celia loves him. He overhears some women talking about how Gorringe bought $30 worth of flowers for his garden. He meets with him and asks him about the flowers, but their conversation becomes coded and Theron attempts to find out if the boy had told Gorringe about Theron and Celia in the forest. Eventually, Theron leaves but not before asking Gorringe if he knows of any scandal about Alice, which the lawyer does not understand due to Alice's purity.

Theron has convinced himself that Gorringe and Alice are having an affair or are somehow conspiring against him. He has dinner with Father Forbes, and tells Forbes that he has decided that he won't be a minister for much longer. The conversation turns to Michael, who is deathly ill, and then to Celia. Forbes doesn't seem to find her as interesting as Ware does, but Theron falls victim to how articulate of a speaker Forbes is. The priest retires for the night and Theron leaves. Father Forbes makes it clear to his housekeeper that the Rev. Theron Ware should not be permitted to visit again. Because of his tendency to try and pry into the friendship between Celia, Forbes, and Ledsmar, Theron angers Forbes and Ledsmar and is no longer welcome in their homes.

The next morning at breakfast, Theron attempts to get a confession out of his wife about her relationship with Gorringe. Nothing arises, but Alice gets very upset and claims that she doesn't like how Theron has changed ever since they moved to Octavius. Theron blames it on the book he is writing, but Alice doesn't fully believe him. He leaves breakfast, and she cries.

Theron starts thinking about why Father Forbes always has pleasant things to say about Celia even though she makes it clear that she is not Catholic. Theron puts the pieces together in his head and thinks that Celia and Father Forbes are sexual partners. He decides to talk to Celia and figures she is with her brother. He visits Michael, who is doing quite well, but warns Theron that if men seek what they want it doesn't always work out best for everybody. Theron then learns from a maid that Celia is heading to New York, and Forbes happens to be there as well. He contemplates going to Albany himself.

Theron boards a train to Albany and is intrigued by the sights he sees outside of his car. He is surprised that a yacht can voyage across the ocean, and thinks that he should travel across the ocean with Celia one day. In New York, Theron is surprised at how much of a hurry some people are in just in their normal lives. He follows Father Forbes meets Celia at the station and Theron follows them to a hotel and to a restaurant for breakfast without detection.

Sitting in the lobby of the hotel, Theron goes up to Celia's room after he sees Forbes leave. She greets him and tells him that she knew he was following her. She tells him to go away but eventually invites him when he is stubborn. Celia reveals that the kiss they shared was meant as a good-bye kiss, and that Dr. Ledsmar and Father Forbes are upset that Theron has constantly talked about Celia with them and attempting to find out something scandalous. During the conversation, Theron imagines killing Celia but he is not disturbed by the thought. There is a knock at the door and Forbes enters and tells Theron that they came to New York so he could introduce the upset Celia to a friend to calm her down.

Reverend Ware has been in New York for two days now, and shows up at the residence of the Soulsbys at five in the morning. They welcome him in tiredly, and urge him to get some sleep. He would rather explain his situation to them than sleep, and after explaining why he is in New York, tells them that he stole money from the church to pay for his experience in the city. Theron eventually falls asleep and Brother Soulsby goes to telegraph Alice.

Back in Octavius, Candace and Alice talk about the changes that are happening in the Wares' lives. Just one year ago they moved to Octavius, and Alice blames the town for changing Theron but Sister Soulsby disagrees. Alice has convinced Theron to leave the ministry and Brother Soulsby has arranged a job in real estate for him in Seattle. As he is ready to leave his house in Octavius for the last time he mentions that he might get in politics and become a senator, of which Alice replies that she has no intention of being a part.

Composition and publication
Frederic made his living as a journalist. He wrote Theron Ware while employed by the New York Times as its London correspondent. Though he authored several novels, it is his "only genuinely notable work of fiction".

First published in 1896 in the UK as Illumination and in the US as The Damnation of Theron Ware, it received a positive critical reception and sold well. A review in the Chicago Tribune said that "It is a book which every one must read who wishes to hold his own in popular literary discussions".  It was republished in 1924 and then reprinted in 1960 by Harvard University Press.

Later references
James Blish used "Theron Ware" as the name of a black magician in his novel Black Easter (1968).

Jonathon Ward adapted Frederic's novel for the stage, requiring a cast of 13 using double casting. For a title he chose The Damnation and Illumination of Theron Ware.

In Main Street by Sinclair Lewis, Carol Kendicott and Vida Sherwin discuss it. Carol was "re-reading" it and asks Vida if she knows it. "Yes. It was clever. But hard. Man wanted to tear down, not build up. Cynical. Oh, I do hope I'm not a sentimentalist. But I can't see any use in this high-art stuff that doesn't encourage us day-laborers to plod on." In turn, F. Scott Fitzgerald wrote in a letter to Lewis that Main Street had "displaced Theron Ware in my favor as the best American novel.”

See also
 The Way of All Flesh by Samuel Butler
 Elmer Gantry by Sinclair Lewis

References

Additional sources

External links
 
 The Damnation of Theron Ware, text and HTML, via Project Gutenberg.
 The Damnation of Theron Ware, scanned books, via Internet Archive.
 
"A Study Guide with Annotated Bibliography", by Robin Taylor Rogers

1896 American novels
Novels set in New York (state)
Realist novels
American bildungsromans